The 1944 United States presidential election in Michigan took place on November 7, 1944, as part of the 1944 United States presidential election. Voters chose 19 representatives, or electors, to the Electoral College, who voted for president and vice president.

Michigan voted narrowly for Democratic nominee, incumbent Franklin D. Roosevelt over Republican Governor of New York Thomas E. Dewey, carrying 50.19% of the vote to Dewey's 49.18%. The election was close, with Detroit, Flint and most of the Upper Peninsula going to Roosevelt and most of the rest of the state going to Dewey. Michigan would not vote Democratic again until John F. Kennedy narrowly won the state in 1960.

This was the only state Roosevelt flipped from the previous election. Meanwhile, Dewey flipped Ohio, Wisconsin, and Wyoming, which had gone for Roosevelt in 1940.

Results

Results by county

See also
 United States presidential elections in Michigan

References

Michigan
1944
1944 Michigan elections